Chrysocale is a genus of moths in the subfamily Arctiinae erected by Francis Walker in 1854.

Species
 Chrysocale betzi Viette, 1980
 Chrysocale corax Hampson, 1901
 Chrysocale ferens Schaus, 1896
 Chrysocale fletcheri Viette, 1980
 Chrysocale gigantea Druce, 1890
 Chrysocale gigas Rothschild, 1911
 Chrysocale ignita Herrich-Schäffer, 1853
 Chrysocale pava Dognin, 1893
 Chrysocale plebeja Herrich-Schäffer, 1853
 Chrysocale principalis Walker, 1864
 Chrysocale regalis Boisduval, 1836
 Chrysocale splendens Dognin, 1888
 Chrysocale uniformis Draudt, 1917

References

Euchromiina
Moth genera